Lanna is surname. Notable people with the surname include:

Ilario Lanna (born 1990), Italian footballer
Marco Lanna (born 1968), Italian footballer
Salvatore Lanna (born 1976), Italian footballer and coach

See also
 Hanna (surname)
 Lanna (given name)